Czesław Hernas (July 12, 1928, Sokal — December 11, 2003, Wrocław) was a Polish philologist and folklorist, professor at the University of Wrocław.

Director of the Institute of Polish Philology (1971-1885), member of the Wroclaw Citizen's Committee of Solidarity (1989-1990)

Books
 Barok. PWN 1972
 Literatura baroku. PWN 1985
 Polnischer Barock. Surkamp Verlag, Frankfurt am Main 1991
 Polska XVII wieku red. J. Tazbir, Wiedza powszechna, Warszawa 1977 (author of section Zarys rozwoju literatury barokowej)
 Hejnały polskie, Studia staropolskie, 1961
 W kalinowym lesie, volumes 1, 2, PIW 1965

Awards
2001: Commander's Cross of the Order of Polonia Restituta
1991:  Medal (for achievements in ethnography)

References

Polish philologists
Polish folklorists
Academic staff of the University of Wrocław
Commanders of the Order of Polonia Restituta
People from Lviv Oblast
1928 births
2003 deaths
20th-century philologists